SS Filipp Mazzei was a Liberty ship built in the United States during World War II. She was named after Filipp Mazzei, an Italian physician and close friend of Thomas Jefferson, Mazzei acted as an agent to purchase arms for Virginia during the American Revolutionary War.

Construction
Filipp Mazzei was laid down on 15 June 1944, under a Maritime Commission (MARCOM) contract, MC hull 2488, by the St. Johns River Shipbuilding Company, Jacksonville, Florida; and was launched on 31 July 1944.

History
She was allocated to the Sprague Steamship Co., Inc., on 9 August 1944. On 3 September 1948, she was laid up in the James River Reserve Fleet, Lee Hall, Virginia. On 26 April 1952, she was laid up in the National Defense Reserve Fleet, Wilmington, North Carolina. On 28 March 1958, she was laid up in the James River Reserve Fleet, Lee Hall, Virginia. She was sold for scrapping, 19 February 1960, to Bethlehem Steel Co., for $70,701. She was removed from the fleet, 1 March 1960.

References

Bibliography

 
 
 
 

 

Liberty ships
Ships built in Jacksonville, Florida
1944 ships
James River Reserve Fleet
Wilmington Reserve Fleet